
Słupca County is a unit of territorial administration and local government (powiat) in Greater Poland Voivodeship, west-central Poland. It came into being on January 1, 1999, as a result of the Polish local government reforms passed in 1998.

As of 2006 its total population is 58,725, out of which the population of Słupca is 14,363, that of Zagórów is 2,932, and the rural population is 41,430.

Neighbouring counties
Słupca County is bordered by Mogilno County to the north, Konin County to the east, Pleszew County to the south, Września County to the west and Gniezno County to the north-west.

Administrative division
The county is subdivided into eight gminas (one urban, one urban-rural and six rural). These are listed in the following table, in descending order of population.

References
Polish official population figures 2006

 
Land counties of Greater Poland Voivodeship